Gulley is an unincorporated community in Johnson Township, Washington County, Arkansas, United States. It is located within Johnson, on Johnson Road along the railroad tracks.

References

Unincorporated communities in Washington County, Arkansas
Unincorporated communities in Arkansas